The Men's 10 kilometre sprint biathlon competition at the 1998 Winter Olympics was held on 18 February 1998, at Nozawa Onsen. Competitors raced over two 3.0 kilometre loops and one 4.0 kilometre loop of the skiing course, shooting two times, once prone and once standing. Each miss was penalized by requiring the competitor to race over a 150-metre penalty loop.

Results

References

Men's biathlon at the 1998 Winter Olympics